Ralph Dwain "Rass" Felton (May 21, 1932 – January 22, 2011) was an American football player.  Felton played college football at the University of Maryland at College Park and was drafted in the fourth round of the 1954 NFL Draft.  He was a linebacker in the National Football League (NFL) for the Washington Redskins and in the American Football League (AFL) for the Buffalo Bills.

See also

 List of American Football League players

References

1932 births
2011 deaths
American football linebackers
Buffalo Bills players
Maryland Terrapins football players
Washington Redskins players
People from Washington County, Pennsylvania
Players of American football from Pennsylvania
American Football League players